International Journal of Clinical and Health Psychology, also known by its Spanish-language title Revista Internacional de Psicologia Clinica y de la Salud, is a triannual peer-reviewed medical journal covering clinical and health psychology. It was established in 2001 and is published by Elsevier and the Asociación Española de Psicología Conductual. The editor-in-chief is Juan Carlos Sierra (Universidad de Granada). According to the Journal Citation Reports, the journal has a 2017 impact factor of 3.900.

References

External links

Clinical psychology journals
Health psychology journals
Elsevier academic journals
Triannual journals
Publications established in 2001
Multilingual journals
Academic journals published by learned and professional societies